Wild tic-tac-toe is an impartial game similar to tic-tac-toe. However, in this game players can choose to place either X or O on each move. This game can also be played in its misere form where if a player creates a three-in-a-row of marks, that player loses the game.

Regular game 
Wild tic-tac-toe is played on a 3-by-3 board. Each of the players take turns placing a X or an O on any unoccupied square. The player who creates a line of 3 X's in a row or 3 O’s in a row wins. This version of the game is forced win for the first player.

Misere game 
This game is exactly like the regular version of the game except the player who creates a line of any three marks (Xs or Os) in a row loses the game.

The second player can force a draw by playing a mark opposite of the opponent's mark and choosing X if the opponent chose O (or vice versa).

See also
Tic-tac-toe variants

References 

Tic-tac-toe
Tic-tac-toe variants